The Victory Shield 2008 is the 63rd edition of the Victory Shield, an annual football tournament that began in 1925 and is competed for by the Under 16 level teams of England, Scotland, Northern Ireland and Wales. It was held from 3 October to 29 November 2008 and won by England.

Venues

Final table

Matches and Results

See also
Victory Shield

External links
Official Victory Shield website

2008
2008–09 in English football
2008–09 in Scottish football
2008–09 in Welsh football
2008–09 in Northern Ireland association football
October 2008 sports events in the United Kingdom
November 2008 sports events in the United Kingdom